Bonny Blue is an unincorporated community and coal town in Lee County, Virginia, United States.

History
The community was likely named for the Bonnie Blue flag, the unofficial banner of the Confederacy at the start of the Civil War. Bonny Blue contained a post office until 1962.

References

Unincorporated communities in Lee County, Virginia
Unincorporated communities in Virginia
Coal towns in Virginia